The Da Vincis are an electro lounge-pop group from Jackson, Mississippi. In 2009, the group released their debut album See You Tonight. The album received airplay on college radio stations throughout the United States as well as overseas airplay on stations such as FBi in Australia and other stations in Spain and France. One of the most notable aspects of the band is their young age. All members of the band have only just graduated from high school and wrote the majority of their first album during the freshman and sophomore years of high school. They have played shows with Pattern is Movement and Dent May.

Reception 

Their debut album See You Tonight received a large amount of praise including articles written by fluxblog, Le Choix de Mille Eddie, and Under the Radar Magazine.com. The band also released a cover of "Paper Planes" by MIA which garnered a 5/5 rating from awmusic.ca.

References

American indie pop groups
Musical groups from Mississippi
Musical groups established in 2006